The Megalopoli Power Plant is an 850 MW power plant in Arcadia in the central Peloponnese that produces electricity for southern Greece and the islands. It produces electricity from coal and lignite mined south in the Megalopoli Mine as well as mines in Thoknia and Kyparissia. The plant employs up to 500 to 1,000 people, most of them are from Megalopoli.

Construction began in the mid-1960s just after the town was struck by the Arcadia earthquake in 1965.  It took three to four years to complete.  By 1971, electricity production began and mining also started.  As all of its coal and lignite are being used up, the plant may close in a few years, potentially laying off hundreds of workers and causing a significant part of its economy to drop.

The power plant had been featured in an ERT documentary which was broadcast in April 2007.

Location
The plant is surrounded by Megalopoli's nearby forest to the southwest, the Alpheus River to the west and another to the north.  The building is in the middle part, its towers are to the southwest and its reactors to the east.  The plant can be seen around the valley, the Lykaio mountains to the north, its mountains to the north, the east and the west.

Environment
The main concern is dumping used-up coal into the Alfeios which ruins its water supply and nature as well as the ancient city of Megalopoli which saw marble and stone begin to rust. Also, as with all fossil fuel based plants, the Megalopoli Power Plant produces large amounts of greenhouse gases that contribute to climate change.

Emission data

See also

 List of power stations in Greece
 Energy in Greece

References

Coal-fired power stations in Greece
Buildings and structures in Arcadia, Peloponnese
Megalopolis, Greece
Energy infrastructure completed in 1971
1971 establishments in Greece